Long rider may refer to:

Equestrian who rides long distances, usually on long-distance trails
Adult hunt seat rider
"Long Rider", a song by Pixies, from the 2019 album Beneath the Eyrie
Long Riders (professional wrestling), the original of the professional wrestling tag team The Smoking Gunns
The Long Riders, a 1980 American Western film
Long Riders!, a Japanese manga series

See also
The Long Ryders, an American alternative country band
Long line rider